The Toronto Maple Leafs are a National Hockey League team, based in Toronto, Ontario, Canada.

Toronto Maple Leafs may also refer to:
Toronto Maple Leafs (semi-pro baseball), an Intercounty Baseball League team
Toronto Maple Leafs (International League), a former AAA minor league baseball team
Toronto Maple Leafs (NLA), a professional box lacrosse team in the National Lacrosse Association 1966–1970
Toronto Maple Leafs (soccer club), a Canadian National Soccer League club from the 1930s
Toronto Tecumsehs (ILL), a box lacrosse team established in 1931 as the Toronto Maple Leafs; see Sports in Toronto#Lacrosse